Cleophas Wakhungu Malalah  is a Kenyan politician. He is the immediate former  senator of Kakamega County.

Early life and education 
Cleophas Wakhungu Malalah sat for his Kenya Certificate of Secondary Education at Friends school Kamusinga before proceeding to USIU where he got his Bachelor's Degree, and currently doing a masters.

Political career 
Malalah was elected senator of Kakamega County in the 2017 general election with the party ANC.

References 

Living people
Members of the Senate of Kenya
Alumni of Friends School Kamusinga
United States International University alumni
Year of birth missing (living people)